Pedro Suinaga (5 April 1907 – 1 October 1980) was a Mexican footballer who represented his nation at the 1928 Summer Olympics in the Netherlands.

References

External links
 

1907 births
1980 deaths
Mexican footballers
Association football midfielders
Footballers at the 1928 Summer Olympics
Olympic footballers of Mexico
Club América footballers
Mexico international footballers